The FIBA U20 European Championship, previously known as the European Championship for Men '22 and Under', is a men's youth basketball competition that was inaugurated with the 1992 edition. Through the 2004 edition, it was held biennially, but since 2005 edition, it is held every year. The tournament was originally an Under-22 age tournament, but it is now an Under-20 age tournament. The current champions are Spain.

Starting with the 2005 B edition, a Division B tournament, which is the secondary level of the European Under-20 Basketball Championship, is also organized. Since the 2013 B edition, the top three placed teams at each year's Division B tournament are promoted to the next year's Division A Championship. This way, the three bottom teams of the Division A Championship are relegated to the next year's Division B Championship.

Division A
The Division A is the top level of the Under-20 championship organized by FIBA Europe.

These teams have always played in Division A, and have never been relegated to Division B:

Results

Medal table
Countries in italics no longer compete in FIBA U20 European Championship

Participation details

 As FR Yugoslavia (1992–2003,  4 participations,  2 medals) and as Serbia and Montenegro (2003–2006, 3 participations,  2 medals)

MVP Awards (since 1996)

Statistical leaders

Top scorers

Assist leaders

Top rebounders

Division B
Division B is the lower tier of the two Under-20 championships organized by FIBA Europe.

Results

 Until 2011, the top two placed teams in Division B were promoted to the next year's Division A.
 In 2012, the top four teams in Division B were promoted to the 2013 Division A.
 Since 2013, the top three teams in Division B are promoted to Division A for the next tournament.

Medal table

See also
FIBA U16 European Championship
FIBA U18 European Championship

References

Archive FIBA

External links
Official website
FIBA Archive

 
Basketball competitions in Europe between national teams
Europe